In music, Op. 93 stands for Opus number 93. Compositions that are assigned this number include:

 Beethoven – Symphony No. 8
 Britten – Phaedra
 Dvořák – Othello
 Schumann – Motet, "Verzweifle nicht im Schmerzenstal" for double chorus and organ ad lib
 Shostakovich – Symphony No. 10
 Spohr – String Quartet No. 30